The Town and Country Planning (Use Classes) Order 1987 (the "UCO 1987") is a Statutory Instrument, applying in England and Wales, that specifies various "Use Classes" for which planning permission is not required for a building or other land to change from one use within that class to another use within that same class.  The UCO 1987 was made by the Secretary of State under authority granted by sections 22 and 287 of the Town and Country Planning Act 1971, which have subsequently been replaced by sections 55 and 333 of the Town and Country Planning Act 1990.

These regulations were amended by the Town and Country Planning (Use Classes) (Amendment) (England) Regulations 2020 (SI 2020 No.757), which took effect on 1 September 2020.

History of the UCO 1987

The UCO 1987 came into force on 1 June 1987, and was introduced by Statutory Instrument 1987 No. 764. The UCO 1987 revoked The Town and Country Planning (Use Classes) Order 1972, which was the previous version of the legislation.

Since it came into force, the UCO 1987 has been amended by a number of subsequent Statutory Instruments. In 1999, the functions of the Secretary of State under various sections of the Town and Country Planning Act 1990 (including sections 55 and 333), so far as exercisable in relation to Wales, were transferred to the National Assembly for Wales. This means that, since 1999, the UCO 1987 has been amended by some Statutory Instruments that apply in relation to England only and some that apply in relation to Wales only, resulting in different versions of the UCO 1987.

With respect to England, the Planning Portal website provides a page that summarises the Use Classes. With respect to England, the Planning Jungle website states that the UCO 1987 has been amended by a total of 14 subsequent Statutory Instruments.

The website www.legislation.gov.uk, which is delivered by the National Archives, provides the original ("as made") version of the UCO 1987, but states that UK Statutory Instruments are not carried in their "revised" form on the website.

Operation of the UCO 1987

Section 57 of the Town and Country Planning Act 1990 sets out that "planning permission is required for the carrying out of any development of land".
Section 55 of the Town and Country Planning Act 1990 defines "development", and states that it does not include "in the case of buildings or other land which are used for a purpose of any class specified in an order made by the Secretary of State under this section, the use of the buildings or other land or, subject to the provisions of the order, of any part of the buildings or the other land, for any other purpose of the same class".
Article 3 of the UCO 1987 states that "Subject to the provisions of this Order, where a building or other land is used for a purpose of any class specified in the Schedule, the use of that building or that other land for any other purpose of the same class shall not be taken to involve development of the land".
The Schedule of the UCO 1987 specifies the Use Classes to which Article 3 refers.

Schedule of the UCO 1987 (the "Use Classes")

The Schedule of the UCO 1987 specifies the Use Classes for which planning permission is not required for a building or other land to change from one use within that class to another use within that same class.

The following table shows the Use Classes in relation to England in their "revised" form, as summarised on the Planning Portal website. References have been added to indicate those Use Classes that are different in relation to Wales.  This table also shows the permitted changes of use (in relation to England) from Schedule 2 Part 3 of the Town and Country Planning (General Permitted Development) (England) Order 2015 (note: some of these permitted changes of use require an application for prior approval to be submitted to the local planning authority).

See also
Town and country planning in the United Kingdom

References

External links
Statutory Instrument 1987 No. 764 - Original (As made)
The Planning Portal website - Change of Use
The Planning Jungle website - Use Classes Order 1987 - Quick Reference Guide

Housing in the United Kingdom
United Kingdom planning law
1987 in British law
Statutory Instruments of the United Kingdom